Martha Graham (May 11, 1894 – April 1, 1991) was an American modern dancer and choreographer. Her style, the Graham technique, reshaped American dance and is still taught worldwide.

Graham danced and taught for over seventy years. She was the first dancer to perform at the White House, travel abroad as a cultural ambassador, and receive the highest civilian award of the US: the Presidential Medal of Freedom with Distinction. In her lifetime she received honors ranging from the Key to the City of Paris to Japan's Imperial Order of the Precious Crown. She said, in the 1994 documentary The Dancer Revealed: "I have spent all my life with dance and being a dancer. It's permitting life to use you in a very intense way. Sometimes it is not pleasant. Sometimes it is fearful. But nevertheless it is inevitable." Founded in 1926 (the same year as Graham's professional dance company), the Martha Graham School is the oldest school of dance in the United States. First located in a small studio within Carnegie Hall, the school currently has two different studios in New York City.

Early life
Graham was born in Allegheny City – later to become part of Pittsburgh, Pennsylvania – in 1894. Her father, George Graham, practiced as what in the Victorian era was known as an "alienist", a practitioner of an early form of psychiatry. The Grahams were strict Presbyterians. Dr. Graham was a third-generation American of Irish descent. Graham's mother, Jane Beers, was a second-generation American of Irish, Scots-Irish, and English ancestry, and who claimed descent from Myles Standish. While her parents provided a comfortable environment in her youth, it was not one that encouraged dancing.

The Graham family moved to Santa Barbara, California when Martha was fourteen years old. In 1911, she attended the first dance performance of her life, watching Ruth St. Denis perform at the Mason Opera House in Los Angeles. In the mid-1910s, Martha Graham began her studies at the newly created Denishawn School of Dancing and Related Arts, founded by Ruth St. Denis and Ted Shawn, at which she would stay until 1923. In 1922, Graham performed one of Shawn's Egyptian dances with Lillian Powell in a short silent film by Hugo Riesenfeld that attempted to synchronize a dance routine on film with a live orchestra and an onscreen conductor.

Career
When she left the Denishawn establishment in 1923, Graham did so with an urge to make dance an art form that was more grounded in the rawness of the human experience as opposed to just a mere form of entertainment. This motivated Graham to strip away the more decorative movements of ballet and of her training at the Denishawn school and focus more on the foundational aspects of movement.

In 1925, Graham was employed at the Eastman School of Music where Rouben Mamoulian was head of the School of Drama. Among other performances, together Mamoulian and Graham produced a short two-color film called The Flute of Krishna, featuring Eastman students. Mamoulian left Eastman shortly thereafter and Graham chose to leave also, even though she was asked to stay on.

In 1926, the Martha Graham Center of Contemporary Dance was established, in a small studio on the Upper East Side of New York City. On April 18 of the same year Graham debuted her first independent concert, consisting of 18 short solos and trios that she had choreographed. This performance took place at the 48th Street Theatre in Manhattan. She would later say of the concert: "Everything I did was influenced by Denishawn." On November 28, 1926, Martha Graham and others in her company gave a dance recital at the Klaw Theatre in New York City. Around the same time she entered an extended collaboration with Japanese-American pictorialist photographer Soichi Sunami, and over the next five years they together created some of the most iconic images of early modern dance. Graham was on the faculty of Neighborhood Playhouse School of the Theatre when it opened in 1928.

One of Graham's students was heiress Bethsabée de Rothschild with whom she became close friends. When Rothschild moved to Israel and established the Batsheva Dance Company in 1965, Graham became the company's first director.

Graham's technique pioneered a principle known as "contraction and release" in modern dance, which was derived from a stylized conception of breathing.

Contraction and release:
The desire to highlight a more base aspect of human movement led Graham to create the "contraction and release", for which she would become known. Each movement could separately be used to express either positive or negative, freeing or constricting emotions depending on the placement of the head. The contraction and release were both the basis for Graham's weighted and grounded style, which is in direct opposition to classical ballet techniques that typically aim to create an illusion of weightlessness. To counter the more percussive and staccato movements, Graham eventually added the spiral shape to the vocabulary of her technique to incorporate a sense of fluidity.

New era in dance

Following her first concert made up of solos, Graham created Heretic (1929), the first group piece of many that showcased a clear diversion from her days with Denishawn, and served as an insight to her work that would follow in the future. Made up of constricted and sharp movement with the dancers clothed unglamorously, the piece centered around the theme of rejection—one that would reoccur in other Graham works down the line.

As time went on Graham moved away from the more stark design aesthetic she initially embraced and began incorporating more elaborate sets and scenery to her work. To do this, she collaborated often with Isamu Noguchi—a Japanese American designer—whose eye for set design was a complementary match to Graham's choreography.

Within the many themes which Graham incorporated into her work, there were two that she seemed to adhere to the most—Americana and Greek mythology. One of Graham's most known pieces that incorporates the American life theme is Appalachian Spring (1944). She collaborated with the composer Aaron Copland—who won a Pulitzer Prize for his work on the piece—and Noguchi, who created the nonliteral set. As she did often, Graham placed herself in her own piece as the bride of a newly married couple whose optimism for starting a new life together is countered by a grounded pioneer woman and a sermon-giving revivalist. Two of Graham's pieces—Cave of Heart (1946) and Night Journey (1947)—display her intrigue not only with Greek mythology but also with the psyche of a woman, as both pieces retell Greek myths from a woman's point of view.

In 1936, Graham created Chronicle, which brought serious issues to the stage in a dramatic manner. Influenced by the Wall Street Crash of 1929, the Great Depression that followed, and the Spanish Civil War, the dance focused on depression and isolation, reflected in the dark nature of both the set and costumes.

That same year, in conjunction with the 1936 Summer Olympic Games in Berlin, the German government wanted to include dance in the Art Competitions that took place during the Olympics, an event that previously included architecture, sculpture, painting, music, and literature. Although Joseph Goebbels, Reich Minister of Propaganda, was not appreciative of the modern dance art form and changed Germany's dance from more avant-garde to traditional, he and Adolf Hitler still agreed to invite Graham to represent the United States. The United States resulted in not being represented in the Art Competitions as Martha Graham refused the invitation by stating:
I would find it impossible to dance in Germany at the present time. So many artists whom I respect and admire have been persecuted, have been deprived of the right to work for ridiculous and unsatisfactory reasons, that I should consider it impossible to identify myself, by accepting the invitation, with the regime that has made such things possible. In addition, some of my concert group would not be welcomed in Germany.
Goebbels himself wrote her a letter assuring her that her Jewish dancers would "receive complete immunity", however, it was not enough for Graham to accept such invitation.

Stimulated by the occurrences of the 1936 Olympic Games, and the propaganda that she heard through the radio from the Axis Powers, Martha Graham creates American Document in 1938. The dance expresses American ideals and democracy as Graham realized that it could empower men and inspire them to fight fascist and Nazi ideologies. American Document ended up as a patriotic statement focusing on rights and injustices of the time, representing the American people including its Native-American heritage and slavery. During the performance, excerpts from The Declaration of Independence, Lincoln's Gettysburg Address, and the Emancipation Proclamation were read. These were passages that highlighted the American ideals and represented what made the American people American. For Graham, a dance needed to "reveal certain national characteristics because without these characteristics the dance would have no validity, no roots, no direct relation to life".

The beginning of American Document marks modern concepts of performance art joining dance, theater and literature and clearly defining the roles of the spectator and the actors/dancers. The narrator/actor starts with "establishing an awareness of the present place and time, which serves not only as a bridge between past and present, but also between individual and collective, particular and general". Together with her unique technique, this sociological and philosophical innovation sets dance as a clear expression of current ideas and places and Graham as a pillar of the modern dance revolution.

1938 became a big year for Graham; the Roosevelts invited Graham to dance at the White House, making her the first dancer to perform there. Also, in 1938, Erick Hawkins became the first man to dance with her company. He officially joined her troupe the following year, dancing male lead in a number of Graham's works. They were married in July 1948 after the New York premiere of Night Journey. He left her troupe in 1951 and they divorced in 1954.

On April 1, 1958, the Martha Graham Dance Company premiered the ballet Clytemnestra, based on the ancient Greek legend Clytemnestra and it became a huge success and great accomplishment for Graham. With a score by Egyptian-born composer Halim El-Dabh, this ballet was a large scale work and the only full-length work in Graham's career. Graham choreographed and danced the title role, spending almost the entire duration of the performance on the stage. The ballet was based on the Greek mythology of the same title and tells the story of Queen Clytemnestra who is married to King Agamemnon. Agamemnon sacrifices their daughter, Iphigenia, on a pyre, as an offering to the gods to assure fair winds to Troy, where the Trojan War rages. Upon Agamemnon's return after 10 years, Clytemnestra kills Agamemnon to avenge the murder of Iphigenia. Clytemnestra is then murdered by her son, Orestes, and the audience experiences Clytemnestra in the afterworld. This ballet was deemed a masterpiece of 20th-century American modernism and was so successful it had a limited engagement showing at the 54th Street Theatre on Broadway, conducted by Robert Irving, voice parts sung by Rosalia Maresca and Ronald Holgate.

Graham collaborated with many composers including Aaron Copland on Appalachian Spring, Louis Horst, Samuel Barber, William Schuman, Carlos Surinach, Norman Dello Joio, and Gian Carlo Menotti. Graham's mother died in Santa Barbara in 1958. Her oldest friend and musical collaborator Louis Horst died in 1964. She said of Horst: "His sympathy and understanding, but primarily his faith, gave me a landscape to move in. Without it, I should certainly have been lost."

Graham resisted requests for her dances to be recorded because she believed that live performances should only exist on stage as they are experienced. There were a few notable exceptions. For example, in addition to her collaboration with Sunami in the 1920s, she also worked on a limited basis with still photographers Imogen Cunningham in the 1930s, and Barbara Morgan in the 1940s. Graham considered Philippe Halsman's photographs of Dark Meadow the most complete photographic record of any of her dances. Halsman also photographed in the 1940s Letter to the World, Cave of the Heart, Night Journey and Every Soul is a Circus. In later years her thinking on the matter evolved and others convinced her to let them recreate some of what was lost. In 1952 Graham allowed taping of her meeting and cultural exchange with famed deafblind author, activist and lecturer Helen Keller, who, after a visit to one of Graham's company rehearsals became a close friend and supporter. Graham was inspired by Keller's joy from and interpretation of dance, utilizing her body to feel the vibration of drums and of feet and movement moving the air around her.

In her biography Martha, Agnes de Mille cites Graham's last performance as having occurred on the evening of May 25, 1968, in Time of Snow. But in A Dancer's Life, biographer Russell Freedman lists the year of Graham's final performance as 1969. In her 1991 autobiography, Blood Memory, Graham herself lists her final performance as her 1970 appearance in Cortege of Eagles when she was 76 years old. Graham's choreographies span 181 compositions.

Retirement and later years
In the years that followed her departure from the stage, Graham sank into a deep depression fueled by views from the wings of young dancers performing many of the dances she had choreographed for herself and her former husband. Graham's health declined precipitously as she abused alcohol to numb her pain. In Blood Memory she wrote,
It wasn't until years after I had relinquished a ballet that I could bear to watch someone else dance it. I believe in never looking back, never indulging in nostalgia, or reminiscing. Yet how can you avoid it when you look on stage and see a dancer made up to look as you did thirty years ago, dancing a ballet you created with someone you were then deeply in love with, your husband? I think that is a circle of hell Dante omitted.

[When I stopped dancing] I had lost my will to live. I stayed home alone, ate very little, and drank too much and brooded. My face was ruined, and people say I looked odd, which I agreed with. Finally my system just gave in. I was in the hospital for a long time, much of it in a coma.

Graham not only survived her hospital stay, but she rallied. In 1972, she quit drinking, returned to her studio, reorganized her company, and went on to choreograph ten new ballets and many revivals. Her last completed ballet was 1990's Maple Leaf Rag.

Death
Graham choreographed until her death in New York City from pneumonia in 1991, aged 96. Just before she became sick with pneumonia, she finished the final draft of her autobiography, Blood Memory, which was published posthumously in the fall of 1991. She was cremated, and her ashes were spread over the Sangre de Cristo Mountains in northern New Mexico.

Influence and legacy
Graham has been sometimes termed the "Picasso of Dance" in that her importance and influence to modern dance can be considered equivalent to what Pablo Picasso was to modern visual arts. Her impact has been also compared to the influence of Stravinsky on music and Frank Lloyd Wright on architecture.

In 2013, the dance films by her were selected for preservation in the National Film Registry by the registry's owner, The Library of Congress.

To celebrate what would have been her 117th birthday on May 11, 2011, Google's logo for one day was turned into one dedicated to Graham's life and legacy.

Graham has been said to be the one that brought dance into the 20th century. Due to the work of her assistants, Linda Hodes, Pearl Lang, Diane Gray, Yuriko, and others, much of Graham's work and technique have been preserved. They taped interviews of Graham describing her entire technique and videos of her performances. As Glen Tetley told Agnes de Mille, "The wonderful thing about Martha in her good days was her generosity. So many people stole Martha's unique personal vocabulary, consciously or unconsciously, and performed it in concerts. I have never once heard Martha say, 'So-and-so has used my choreography.'" An entire movement was created by her that revolutionized the dance world and created what is known today as modern dance. Now, dancers all over the world study and perform modern dance. Choreographers and professional dancers look to her for inspiration.

According to Agnes de Mille:
The greatest thing [Graham] ever said to me was in 1943 after the opening of Oklahoma!, when I suddenly had unexpected, flamboyant success for a work I thought was only fairly good, after years of neglect for work I thought was fine. I was bewildered and worried that my entire scale of values was untrustworthy. I talked to Martha. I remember the conversation well. It was in a Schrafft's restaurant over a soda. I confessed that I had a burning desire to be excellent, but no faith that I could be. Martha said to me, very quietly: "There is a vitality, a life force, an energy, a quickening that is translated through you into action, and because there is only one of you in all of time, this expression is unique. And if you block it, it will never exist through any other medium and it will be lost. The world will not have it. It is not your business to determine how good it is nor how valuable nor how it compares with other expressions. It is your business to keep it yours clearly and directly, to keep the channel open. You do not even have to believe in yourself or your work. You have to keep yourself open and aware to the urges that motivate you. Keep the channel open ... No artist is pleased. [There is] no satisfaction whatever at any time. There is only a queer divine dissatisfaction, a blessed unrest that keeps us marching and makes us more alive than the others."

In 2021 actress Mary Beth Peil portrayed Graham in the Netflix series Halston.

Martha Graham Dance Company

The Martha Graham Dance Company is the oldest dance company in America, founded in 1926. It has helped develop many famous dancers and choreographers of the 20th and 21st centuries including Erick Hawkins, Anna Sokolow, Merce Cunningham, Lila York, and Paul Taylor. It continues to perform, including at the Saratoga Performing Arts Center in June 2008. The company also performed in 2007 at the Museum of Contemporary Art, Chicago, with a program consisting of: Appalachian Spring, Embattled Garden, Errand into the Maze, and American Original.

Early dancers
Graham's original female dancers consisted of Bessie Schonberg, Evelyn Sabin, Martha Hill, Gertrude Shurr, Anna Sokolow, Nelle Fisher, Dorothy Bird, Bonnie Bird, Sophie Maslow, May O'Donnell, Jane Dudley, Anita Alvarez, Pearl Lang, and Marjorie G. Mazia. A second group included Yuriko, Ethel Butler, Ethel Winter, Jean Erdman, Patricia Birch, Nina Fonaroff, Matt Turney, Mary Hinkson. The group of men dancers was made up of Erick Hawkins, Merce Cunningham, David Campbell, John Butler, Robert Cohan, Stuart Hodes, Glen Tetley, Bertram Ross, Paul Taylor, Donald McKayle, Mark Ryder, and William Carter.

Accolades

In 1957, Graham was elected a Fellow of the American Academy of Arts and Sciences. She was awarded the Presidential Medal of Freedom in 1976 by President Gerald Ford (the First Lady Betty Ford had danced with Graham in her youth). Ford declared her "a national treasure".

Graham was the first recipient of the American Dance Festival's award for her lifetime achievement in 1981.

In 1984 Graham was awarded the highest French order of merit, the Legion of Honour by then Minister of culture Jack Lang.

Graham was inducted into the National Museum of Dance's Mr. & Mrs. Cornelius Vanderbilt Whitney Hall of Fame in 1987.

In 1990 the Council of Fashion Designers of America awarded Graham with the Geoffrey Beene Lifetime Achievement Award.

In 1998 Graham was posthumously named "Dancer of the Century" by Time magazine, and one of the female "Icons of the Century" by People.

In 2015 she was posthumously inducted into the National Women's Hall of Fame.

On May 11, 2020, on what would have been Graham's 126th birthday, the New York Public Library for the Performing Arts announced it had acquired Graham's archives for its Jerome Robbins Dance Division. The archive consists mainly of paper-based material, photographs and films, including rare footage of Graham dancing in works such as "Appalachian Spring" and "Hérodiade"; her script for "Night Journey"; and her handwritten notes for "American Document".

Choreography
This excerpt from John Martin's reviews in The New York Times provides insight on Graham's choreographic style. "Frequently the vividness and intensity of her purpose are so potent that on the rise of the curtain they strike like a blow, and in that moment one must decide whether he is for or against her. She boils down her moods and movements until they are devoid of all extraneous substances and are concentrated to the highest degree." Graham created 181 ballets.

See also

 American Dance Festival
 Christine Dakin
 Concert dance
 List of dancers
 List of dance companies
 Postmodern dance
 Terese Capucilli
 Women in dance

Citations

Cited sources

Further reading
 
 
 
 Helpern, Alice. Martha, 1998
 Hodes, Stuart, Part Real – Part Dream, Dancing With Martha Graham, (2011) Concord ePress, Concord, Massachusetts

External links

 Library of Congress online collection
 PBS:American Masters biography
 Kennedy Center biography
 
 
 MarthaGraham.org – Martha Graham Center of Contemporary Dance
 University of Pittsburgh online text
 Library of Congress image of Martha Graham recital program
 Guide to the Barbara Morgan Photographs of Martha Graham and Company; Special Collections and Archives, The UC Irvine Libraries, Irvine, California
 Archival footage of the Martha Graham Dance Company performing Rite of Spring in 2013 at Jacob's Pillow Dance Festival

 
1894 births
1991 deaths
20th-century American dancers
American choreographers
American female dancers
American people of English descent
American people of Irish descent
American people of Scotch-Irish descent
American women choreographers
Artists from Pittsburgh
Ballet choreographers
Cornish College of the Arts faculty
Dancers from Pennsylvania
Fellows of the American Academy of Arts and Sciences
Kennedy Center honorees
Modern dance
Modern dancers
Presidential Medal of Freedom recipients
Sarah Lawrence College faculty
United States National Medal of Arts recipients